Dracula posadarum or the Posada's dracula is a species of orchid.

References

posadarum